Phonology in Generative Grammar is a 1994 book by  Michael Kenstowicz in which the author provides an introduction to phonology in the framework of generative grammar.

Reception
The book was reviewed by Daniel A. Dinnsen, Stephen Parker, Tracy Alan Hall and Jolanta Szpyra.
Helen Fraser calls it a "very large, very thorough and very highly regarded phonology textbook."

References

External links 
 Phonology in Generative Grammar
1994 non-fiction books
Phonology books
Linguistics textbooks
Wiley-Blackwell books
Generative linguistics